Didier Gamerdinger (born 1 October 1959) is a Monegasque windsurfer. He competed in the men's Division II event at the 1988 Summer Olympics.

References

External links
 
 

1959 births
Living people
Monegasque windsurfers
Monegasque male sailors (sport)
Olympic sailors of Monaco
Sailors at the 1988 Summer Olympics – Division II
Recipients of the Order pro Merito Melitensi
Place of birth missing (living people)